Clinton Jones (born 2 February 1984) is a former Australian rules footballer who played for St Kilda Football Club in the Australian Football League (AFL) from 2007 to 2014. He retired from professional Australian Football in 2019.

Australian Football Career

WAFL

Jones began his career with South Fremantle in the WAFL. At South Fremantle he won consecutive best and fairest awards, and was a part of South's 2005 premiership winning team. Following that Grand Final, he was mistakenly announced as the winner of the Simpson Medal, before it was corrected and the true winner Toby McGrath was awarded the medal.

AFL Career with St Kilda

Drafted 2006
Jones was drafted to the Saints as a mature aged rookie with the 9th selection in the 2006 AFL Rookie Draft at the age of 22.

Jones didn't have to wait long for his AFL Debut, playing his first game in St Kilda's 50 point win over the Western Bulldogs in Round 3 of the 2007 AFL Regular Season. He played 6 games in his first season, where 's underwhelming season finished without finals participation.

NAB Cup Winner
2008 started brightly, with Jones playing a pivotal role in St Kilda’s 2008 National Australia Bank Cup winning team that defeated Richmond, Geelong, Essendon, and Adelaide to win the club's first pre-season cup since 2004.

He went on to play 20 games in his second season at the Saints, including the final 17 consecutive games of a  FC season that ended in the Preliminary Final. He played in his first finals win with the Saints in the Semi-Final victory over Collingwood at the M.C.G. Jones quickly developed a reputation as a dynamic run with player and impressive handballer, racking up an average of over 17 disposals per game for the year. Jones was immediately prioritized to play a nullifying role on some of the opposition teams best midfielders, with immediate results.

2009 Minor Premiership & Grand Final
Jones played in 21 of St Kilda FC's 22 home and away matches in the 2009 AFL Regular Season. St Kilda set a new club record for consecutive wins during the season, which resulted in St Kilda topping the premiership standings, winning the McClelland Trophy for the AFL Minor Premiership.

Jones played in all three Finals Series matches, averaging 17 disposals per finals match, and kicked a crucial goal in St Kilda FC's 3 goals in less than a minute of playing time burst at the end of the second quarter in the Grand Final. After the season, he won the Robert Harvey Most Professional Player Award during the Saints post season Trevor Barker Award ceremony. He was also named in media writer and commentator Mike Sheahan's top 50 AFL players for 2009, coming in at 49th.

Grand Final 2010
Before the start of the 2010 season Jones changed his number from 38 to 4, which had previously been worn by club legends Barry Breen, Tony Lockett, and Darrel Baldock, amongst others.

Jones had his most prolific season to date in 2010, averaging 21 disposals in his 24 games for the season, whilst playing as a run with nullifying player whose main task was restricting an opposition midfielder's total disposals and effectiveness. He played in his first ever 30 disposal plus game against Fremantle in Round 4, a win by 15 points. Despite obvious adversity during the season, St Kilda FC qualified third for the final series. Jones had 14 disposals and kicked a spectacular goal in the Saints win in the Qualifying Final over Geelong. He played in the Preliminary Final win and had 19 disposals in the Saints Grand Final team.

2011 to 2014
Jones played a further 23 games in St Kilda FC's 2011 season. The Saints had an oppressive start to the season, in an underwhelming 15th position after 8 rounds. The team won 12 of the last 16 matches, including 8 of the last 10 for the regular season, qualifying a creditable 6th for the Finals Series according to the official standings. Jones was the club's leading tackler for the season with a total of 142. He received a best on ground 3 Brownlow medal votes from the field umpires in the Saints Round 20 win over Fremantle. St Kilda's season ended prematurely in the Elimination Final.

Jones played 17, 19 and 16 games respectively in his final 3 seasons at St Kilda FC between 2012 and 2014, a period in which St Kilda FC did not get to participate in any of the three Finals Series. Like his career in general, he consistently averaged around the 20 disposals a game.

The only controversy Jones was involved in was in September 2013 at the club's "Mad Monday" players end of season event. Jones was accused of appearing to try to set a dwarf entertainer's costume on fire with a cigarette lighter. He later sincerely apologised and was issued with a 3000 fine by the club.

Jones was delisted by St Kilda FC at the end of the 2014 Premiership season with a total of 149 games for his career.

After St Kilda FC
In February 2015, Jones was given a short-term contract by Essendon to play in the 2015 NAB Challenge as a "top-up" player, due to 26 Essendon players withdrawing from the NAB Challenge because of the ongoing Essendon Football Club supplements controversy, which ultimately led to the Essendon players involved being found guilty of doping by the World Court of Arbitration for Sport and serving bans. Jones did not continue as a top-up player for Essendon during the 2015 Premiership Season, making his final AFL appearance the Round 23 match for St Kilda FC in 2014.

Jones was a player for the Perth Football Club in the Western Australian Football League (WAFL) from 2015-2019. He retired from football in 2019.

Statistics
Statistics are correct to the end of the 2014 season

|-
|- style="background-color: #EAEAEA"
! scope="row" style="text-align:center" | 2007
|style="text-align:center;"|
| 38 || 6 || 1 || 1 || 37 || 22 || 59 || 13 || 17 || 0.2 || 0.2 || 6.2 || 3.7 || 9.8 || 2.2 || 2.8
|-
! scope="row" style="text-align:center" | 2008
|style="text-align:center;"|
| 38 || 20 || 6 || 8 || 160 || 194 || 354 || 83 || 71 || 0.3 || 0.4 || 8.0 || 9.7 || 17.7 || 4.2 || 3.6
|- style="background-color: #EAEAEA"
! scope="row" style="text-align:center" | 2009
|style="text-align:center;"|
| 38 || 24 || 9 || 3 || 188 || 255 || 443 || 60 || 116 || 0.4 || 0.1 || 7.8 || 10.6 || 18.5 || 2.5 || 4.8
|-
! scope="row" style="text-align:center" | 2010
|style="text-align:center;"|
| 4 || 24 || 5 || 5 || 210 || 293 || 503 || 71 || 134 || 0.2 || 0.2 || 8.8 || 12.2 || 21.0 || 3.0 || 5.6
|- style="background-color: #EAEAEA"
! scope="row" style="text-align:center" | 2011
|style="text-align:center;"|
| 4 || 23 || 6 || 5 || 203 || 241 || 444 || 54 || 142 || 0.3 || 0.2 || 8.8 || 10.5 || 19.3 || 2.3 || 6.2
|-
! scope="row" style="text-align:center" | 2012
|style="text-align:center;"|
| 4 || 17 || 2 || 1 || 116 || 191 || 307 || 54 || 106 || 0.1 || 0.1 || 6.8 || 11.2 || 18.1 || 3.2 || 6.2
|- style="background-color: #EAEAEA"
! scope="row" style="text-align:center" | 2013
|style="text-align:center;"|
| 4 || 19 || 6 || 1 || 205 || 195 || 400 || 60 || 70 || 0.3 || 0.1 || 10.8 || 10.3 || 21.1 || 3.2 || 3.7
|-
! scope="row" style="text-align:center" | 2014
|style="text-align:center;"|
| 4 || 16 || 5 || 4 || 148 || 154 || 302 || 45 || 76 || 0.3 || 0.3 || 9.3 || 9.6 || 18.9 || 2.8 || 4.8
|- class="sortbottom"
! colspan=3| Career
! 149
! 40
! 28
! 1267
! 1545
! 2812
! 440
! 732
! 0.3
! 0.2
! 8.5
! 10.4
! 18.9
! 3.0
! 4.9
|}

References

External links 

Clinton Jones Announces Retirement Perth Football Club

1984 births
Living people
St Kilda Football Club players
South Fremantle Football Club players
Sandringham Football Club players
Australian rules footballers from Western Australia
Perth Football Club players